Raetz is a surname. People with that name include:

 Christian R. H. Raetz (1946-2011), George Barth Geller Professor of Biochemistry at Duke University
 Dennis Raetz (born 1946), American football player, coach and scout
 Markus Raetz (1941-2020), Swiss painter, illustrator and sculptor

See also